Boćwinka refers to the following places in Poland:

 Boćwinka, Giżycko County
 Boćwinka, Gmina Gołdap